Kenny van Gaalen (born 29 January 1988) is a Dutch sidecarcross rider and the 2012 Sidecarcross World Champion, riding as passenger with Daniël Willemsen.

Biography
Kenny van Gaalen began his sidecarcross career as the passenger of Belgian driver Ben Adriaenssen  in 2004, racing in the Netherlands in the competition of the Motorsport Organisatie Nederland, a Dutch amateur motorsport organisation

In 2009 the pair moved up to semi-professional level and entered the World Championship, making their debut at the Swiss Grand Prix at Wohlen. They finished the season in 18th place overall with three sixth place finishes as their best race results. In the team's second World Championship campaign, in 2010, Adriaenssen and van Gaalen finished sixth overall, with a second place in the first race of the Danish Grand Prix as their best result.

In 2011 van Gaalen did only race sporadically, at the side of fellow Dutchman Bjorn Roes. In the 2012 edition van Gaalen replaced Haralds Kurpnieks who broke his wrist in the first Grand Prix of the season as Daniël Willemsen's passenger but himself suffered a knee injury in the second French Grand Prix, and being in turn replaced by Lauris Daiders for the last five GP's. Van Gaalen took out the World Championship as a passenger because he earned more than 50 percent of the total points Willemsen took out in the 2012 championship, the necessary requirement for a passenger to become World Champion as per FIM regulations.

In 2013 van Gaalen did not race at World Championship level while his former partner, Ben Adriaenssen, took out the World Championship. He returned for the 2014 season, now as passenger of then 17-year-old Koen Hermans. The pair raced together again in 2015, now coming sixth overall.

Season by season
The season by season results in the world championship for Kenny van Gaalen:

Honours

World Championship
 Champions: 2012

References

External links
 The World Championship on Sidecarcross.com

1988 births
Living people
Dutch sidecarcross riders
Sportspeople from 's-Hertogenbosch